Zainuddin ( or ) was a medieval Bengali poet of the 15th century. He was under the patronage of Prince Yusuf Khan, who would later become the Sultan of Bengal.

Early life and education
Zainuddin was born into a Bengali Muslim family in the 15th century. His father, Moinuddin, claimed descent from Abu Bakr, a companion of the Prophet Muhammad and the inaugural Rashidun Caliph. Zainuddin was a Sufi murid, and his pir was Shah Muhammad Khan.

Career
Between 1472 and 1473, Zainuddin composed a fictional tale titled Rasul Bijay, the source of which is said to have been a novel in the Persian language. Its plot consisted of a war in which Jaikum, a fictional king of Iraq, was defeated by the Muslims who were led by Prophet Muhammad. The book was sponsored by Yusuf Khan, the son of Sultan Rukunuddin Barbak Shah of the Ilyas Shahi dynasty.

Further reading

References

15th-century Bengali poets
15th-century Indian Muslims
Bengali male poets
Place of death unknown
15th-century births
Year of death unknown
Bengal Sultanate officers